Tatiana Sergeevna Bershadskaya (July 4, 1921  – May 8, 2021, Russian: Бершадская Татьяна Сергеевна) was a Russian musicologist, music theorist, doctor of arts and professor of the Saint Petersburg State Conservatory. She held the title of Honored Art Worker of Russia. 

Bershadskaya was born in Petrograd, USSR. She died on May 8, 2021, at the age of 99.

References

External links
 Tatiana Bershadskaya's home page
 Interview with Tatiana Bershadskaya. Saint-Petersburg Contemporary Music Center "reMusik.org"
 Tatiana Bershadskaya | List of Published Academic Works (in Russian)

1921 births
2021 deaths
Russian musicologists
Women musicologists
20th-century musicologists
Academic staff of Saint Petersburg Conservatory
Soviet musicologists